Eois russearia is a moth in the  family Geometridae. It is found in Suriname.

References

Moths described in 1818
Eois
Moths of South America